This is the list of Commonwealth Games records in track cycling.

Men's records
♦ denotes a performance that is also a current Para-cycling world record. Statistics are correct as of the 2018 Commonwealth Games.

Women's records
♦ denotes a performance that is also a current Para-cycling world record. Statistics are correct as of the 2018 Commonwealth Games.

See also

Commonwealth Games records

References

Track cycling records
Track cycling at the Commonwealth Games
Commonwealth Games records
Commonwealth Games